MDIS may refer to:

 McDonnell Douglas Information Systems, now known as NEC Software Solutions
 Management Development Institute of Singapore
 Mercury Dual Imaging System, carried on the MESSENGER space probe